Moongate can refer to several things:

A Moon gate is a circular passageway found in Chinese, Japanese and Bermudian architecture.

Books
Moongate (book) a book by William L. Brian II alleging a conspiracy around the Apollo moon landings
Moongate (novel), a 2002 science fiction novel by William Proctor and David Weldon

Video Games
Moongates, the magical doorways in the Ultima game series.
In Mabinogi, moongates are a way of fast traveling from city to city at night